Novyye Kartavly (Yañı Qaratawlı) is a rural locality (a village) in Alkinsky Selsoviet, Salavatsky District, Bashkortostan, Russia. The population was 364 as of 2010. There are 9 streets.

Geography 
Novyye Kartavly is located 6 km south of Maloyaz (the district's administrative centre) by road. Maloyaz is the nearest rural locality.

References 

Rural localities in Salavatsky District